Eutrephoceras is an extinct genus of nautilus from the Late Jurassic to the Miocene (around 161 to 5 million years ago). They are characterized by a highly rounded involute shell with slightly sinuous suture patterns.

Description
Eutrephoceras typically possess nearly globular conchs (shells). The whorls are reniform (kidney-shaped) in cross section and broadly rounded on the sides and lower edge. On the upper edge it is only slightly curved. The surface of the shell is usually smooth, but can sometimes be sculptured. The suture patterns are slightly sinuous, though it can be more or less straight in some species. The umbilicus is small and barely noticeable, sometimes hidden altogether. The septa are averagely convex towards the tip. The siphuncle is small and circular in cross section. It can vary in position considerably and its placement is important in identifying different species under the genus, but it is never marginal.

Puncture marks made by teeth on several Late Cretaceous-aged Eutrephoceras fossils (such as E. campbelli, of the Trent River Formation in Vancouver) are cited as evidence of mosasaur predation on this genus.

Distribution
Eutrephoceras can be found in Late Jurassic to Miocene formations confirmed in many places in the earth, and many species are valid.

Taxonomy
Eutrephoceras is classified under the family Nautilidae, which includes the only extant nautiloids of the genera Allonautilus and Nautilus. They are part of the superfamily Nautilaceae, the only superfamily of nautiloids to survive past the Triassic. Eutrephoceras are sometimes separated into the monogeneric family Eutrephoceratidae as first proposed by A.K. Miller in 1951, but most authors include it under Nautilidae.

Species under Eutrephoceras include the following. This list is incomplete.

Eutrephoceras antarcticum Landman et al., 2004
Eutrephoceras berryi Miller 1947
Eutrephoceras bryani (Gabb 1877)
Eutrephoceras campbelli 
Eutrephoceras carolinensis Kellum 1926
Eutrephoceras cookanum (Whitfield 1892)
Eutrephoceras dartevellei Miller, 1951
Eutrephoceras dekayi (Morton 1834) (type)
Eutrephoceras dorbignyanum (Forbes in Darwin, 1846)
Eutrephoceras eyerdami Palmer, 1961
Eutrephoceras hallidayi (Waring 1914)
Eutrephoceras hannai Vokes 1937
Eutrephoceras japonicum (Shimizu 1926)
Eutrephoceras johnsoni Miller 1947
Eutrephoceras jonesi Miller and Thompson 1933
Eutrephoceras laverdei Durham, 1946
Eutrephoceras marksi Miller 1947
Eutrephoceras oregonense Miller 1947
Eutrephoceras reesidei Stenzel 1940
Eutrephoceras simile Spath 1953
Eutrephoceras sloani Reeside 1924
Eutrephoceras sphaericum (Forbes 1846)
Eutrephoceras stephensoni (Dickerson 1914)

References

External links

Nautiluses
Prehistoric nautiloid genera
Oxfordian first appearances
Jurassic molluscs
Cretaceous cephalopods
Paleocene molluscs
Eocene molluscs
Oligocene molluscs
Miocene molluscs
Miocene genus extinctions
Eocene animals of South America
Prehistoric molluscs of North America